Dumbarton Burghs was a district of burghs constituency of the House of Commons of the Parliament of the United Kingdom from 1918 to 1950.

Boundaries 
It consisted of the burghs of Dumbarton and Clydebank in Dunbartonshire. The rest of the county formed the rural (or county) constituency of Dunbartonshire.

History 
Before creation of the Dumbarton Burghs constituency the burgh of Dumbarton had formed part of the constituency of Kilmarnock Burghs, and Clydebank had been within the Dunbartonshire county constituency.  When Dumbarton Burghs was abolished the whole county of Dunbartonshire was re-organised into two new county constituencies, Dunbartonshire East and Dunbartonshire West.

For almost all of its history Dumbarton Burghs was represented by David Kirkwood of the Labour Party, an important Red Clydesider.  The only exception was 1918 to 1922, when it was represented by John Taylor, a supporter of David Lloyd George's coalition government.

Members of Parliament

Election results

See also 
 Former United Kingdom Parliament constituencies

References

Historic parliamentary constituencies in Scotland (Westminster)
Constituencies of the Parliament of the United Kingdom established in 1918
Constituencies of the Parliament of the United Kingdom disestablished in 1950
Politics of West Dunbartonshire